The IEEE Transactions on Dependable and Secure Computing is a bimonthly peer-reviewed scientific journal covering all aspects of dependability and security. It is published by the IEEE Computer Society and was established in 2004. The current editor-in-chief is Jaideep Vaidya (Rutgers University). According to the Journal Citation Reports, the journal has a 2019 impact factor of 6.404.

References

External links

IEEE academic journals
Computer science journals
Publications established in 2004
English-language journals
Bimonthly journals